The year 562 BC was a year of the pre-Julian Roman calendar. In the Roman Empire, it was known as year 192 Ab urbe condita. The denomination 562 BC for this year has been used since the early medieval period, when the Anno Domini calendar era became the prevalent method in Europe for naming years.

Events
 Amel-Marduk succeeds Nebuchadnezzar II as king of Babylon.

Deaths
 Nebuchadnezzar II, emperor of the Neo-Babylonian Empire

References